The 1900 United States presidential election in Wisconsin was held on November 6, 1900 as part of the 1900 United States presidential election. State voters chose 12 electors to the Electoral College, who voted for president and vice president.

Background
Wisconsin during the Third Party System was a Republican-leaning but competitive state whereby historically anti-Civil War German Catholic counties stood opposed to highly pro-war and firmly Republican Yankee areas. However, following the Populist movement, whose inflationary monetary policies were opposed by almost all urban classes and viewed as dangerously radical by rural German Catholics, Wisconsin’s upper classes, along with the majority of workers who followed them, completely fled from William Jennings Bryan’s agrarian and free silver sympathies. Although in 1892 Grover Cleveland had become the first Democrat to carry the state since the formation of the Republican Party, in 1896 Wisconsin would prove Republican William McKinley’s strongest state outside the Northeast, as Bryan’s free silver monetary policy gained little support from dairy farmers who were less affected by drought or debt than wheat growers.

Wisconsin would henceforth become almost a one-party polity dominated by the Republican Party. The Democratic Party became entirely uncompetitive outside the previously anti-Yankee areas adjoining Lake Michigan in the eastern part of the state. In response to Democratic strength weakening severely after 1894, however, challenges within the state Republican Party from Robert M. La Follette would emerge rapidly, with the progressive reformer being elected Governor coincident with the presidential election.

Vote
Despite McKinley’s large win in 1896, Wisconsin was considered doubtful at the beginning of the 1900 campaign. However, by the middle of October expert opinion suggested strongly that McKinley would carry the state, and that the state’s Democrats were abandoning nominee William Jennings Bryan for the second consecutive election. This was confirmed by polls just before Election Day, and as it turned out McKinley essentially repeated his three-to-two success of 1896, winning by 24,09 points and carrying all but four counties.

Results

Results by county

See also
 United States presidential elections in Wisconsin

References

Wisconsin
1900 Wisconsin elections
1900